Kiri Shamozai is a town and union council in Dera Ismail Khan District of Khyber-Pakhtunkhwa. It is located at 31°24'30N 70°29'8E and has an altitude of 212 metres (698 feet).

References

Union councils of Dera Ismail Khan District
Populated places in Dera Ismail Khan District